Owolabi is a Yoruba given name and surname meaning "we've birthed wealth". Notable people with this name include:

Given name

 Israel Mobolaji Temitayo Odunayo Oluwafemi Owolabi Adesanya, Nigerian-born New Zealand professional mixed martial artist
 Raheem Owolabi Isiaka, Nigerian footballer

Surname

 Abdulazeez Owolabi, Nigerian footballer
 Felix Owolabi, Nigerian footballer
 Ganiyu Owolabi, Nigerian footballer
 Israel Esan Owolabi, Nigerian engineer and academic
 Kubrat Owolabi, Nigerian table tennis player
 Tunde Owolabi, Belgian footballer

References 

Yoruba-language surnames